This is a list of people who have served as Custos Rotulorum of Cardiganshire.

 Walter Devereux, 1st Viscount Hereford 1543–1558
 John Price 1558 – aft. 1579
 George Devereux c. 1584
 Richard Price 1590 – 1592, 1594 – 1623
 Sir John Lewis bef. 1621–1623
 Sir John Lewis 1623–1626
 William Compton, 1st Earl of Northampton 1626–1630
 Richard Vaughan, 2nd Earl of Carbery 1630–1646
 Interregnum
 Francis Vaughan, Lord Vaughan 1660–1667
 Richard Vaughan, 2nd Earl of Carbery 1670–1686
 John Vaughan, 3rd Earl of Carbery 1686–1713
 Price Devereux, 9th Viscount Hereford 1714
 John Vaughan, 1st Viscount Lisburne 1714–1721
 John Vaughan, 2nd Viscount Lisburne 1721–1741
 vacant
 Thomas Johnes 1743–1780
 Wilmot Vaughan, 1st Earl of Lisburne 1780–1800
For later custodes rotulorum, see Lord Lieutenant of Cardiganshire.

References

Institute of Historical Research - Custodes Rotulorum 1544-1646
Institute of Historical Research - Custodes Rotulorum 1660-1828

Cardiganshire